The Military Decree of Amphipolis (c. 200 BC) is a Macedonian Greek inscription of two marble blocks, that originally contain at least three columns of text. It preserves a list of regulations governing the behaviour and discipline of the Macedonian army in camp.

Other military terms mentioned are: ephodos (inspection patrol), ekkoition ("out-of-bed", LSJ: night-watch), stegnopoiia (building the barracks), skenopoiia (tent-making), phragmos (fencing in), diastasis, phylax (guard), hypaspists,  parembole, stratopedon (camp), speirarch (commander of a speira), tetrarch, and the strategoi.

See also

Antigonid Macedonian army

References
Amphipolis — c. 200 BC  Meletemata 22, Epig. App. 12  SEG 40.524
Archaic and Classical Greece By Michael Hewson Crawford, David Whitehead Page 596 
The Hellenistic Age from the battle of Ipsos to the death of Kleopatra VII By Stanley Mayer Burstein Page 88 
Macedonian Warrior Alexander's Elite Infantryman By Waldemar Heckel, Ryan Jones, Christa Hook Page 24  

Greek inscriptions
Ancient Macedonian army
Antigonid Macedonia
Ancient Amphipolis
Decrees